is a subway station on the Tokyo Metro Chiyoda Line in Minato, Tokyo, Japan, operated by the Tokyo subway operator Tokyo Metro.

Lines

Station layout

The station has one island platform serving two tracks.

Platforms

History
Nogizaka Station opened on 20 October 1972.

The station facilities were inherited by Tokyo Metro after the privatization of the Teito Rapid Transit Authority (TRTA) in 2004.

Since 2016, the station's departure melody is an instrumental rendition of the song "Kimi no Na wa Kibō" by the pop group Nogizaka46, performed by Nogizaka46 member Erika Ikuta on the piano.

Surrounding area

 Aoyama Cemetery
 Nogi Shrine
 The National Art Center, Tokyo
 National Graduate Institute for Policy Studies
 Akasaka Press Center
 Stars and Stripes
 Tokyo Midtown
 Roppongi Hills

See also
 List of railway stations in Japan

References

External links

 Tokyo Metro station information 

Railway stations in Japan opened in 1972
Tokyo Metro Chiyoda Line
Buildings and structures in Minato, Tokyo
Railway stations in Tokyo